Aioun  or El Aioun is a town and commune in the Assaba Region of southern Mauritania near the border with Mali. It has a population of 22,796.

References

External links
Official site

Communes of Hodh Ech Chargui Region